Spell of the Looking Glass (German: Im Bann des Eulenspiegels) is a 1932 German comedy drama film directed by Frank Wisbar and starring Franz Weber, Ursula Grabley, and Oskar Karlweis. It was shot at the Johannisthal Studios in Berlin. The film's sets were designed by the art directors Karl Machus and Fritz Maurischat.

Cast
 Franz Weber as Baron Altmann 
 Ursula Grabley as Elli Altmann, seine Tochter 
 Oskar Karlweis as Menzel, Beamter im Gefängnislazarett 
 Till Klockow as Lissy, Krankenschwester im Gefängnislazarett 
 Karl Platen as Lehmkuhl, Chefarzt im Gefängnislazarett 
 Theo Lingen as Rosnowsky, Finanzagent 
 Hugo Fischer-Köppe as Erster Ausbrecher 
 Raimund Janitschek as Zweiter Ausbsrecher 
 Hedwig Wangel as Witwe Schramm, Besitzerin der Paradies-Bar 
 Olly Gebauer as Adelheit, ihre Nichte 
 Fritz Beckmann as Onkel Max 
 Emmy Wyda as Tante Ida 
 Marion Taal as Marion 
 Ernst Wurmser as Der Portier

References

Bibliography 
 Thomas Elsaesser & Michael Wedel. The BFI companion to German cinema. British Film Institute, 1999.

External links 
 

1932 films
1932 comedy-drama films
German comedy-drama films
Films of the Weimar Republic
1930s German-language films
Films directed by Frank Wisbar
Terra Film films
American black-and-white films
1930s German films
Films shot at Johannisthal Studios